Megistonyx is an extinct genus of ground sloth endemic to South America during the Late Pleistocene (Lujanian). It is known from one skeleton collected in the Andes of Venezuela, and is closely related to Ahytherium.

History of discovery 

The various known pieces of the skeleton were recovered in two expeditions to the cave in 1993 and 1997. The specimen was found in a scattered condition, with some bones being damaged, notably the skull was missing the left Squamosal bone. The specimen is currently known from the aforementioned skull, both a right and left humerus, a left ulna, two thoracic vertebrae, a complete rib and three rib fragments. There is apparently more of the specimen left in-situ in the cave. The age of the specimen was found to be approximately 17,300 Cal BP

Distribution and habitat 
The specimen is approximately 17,000 years old, this would put the specimen just after the retreat of the glaciers after the Last Glacial Maximum, which could indicate a cold climate. However, the specimen is associated with fossils of Neochoerus (an extinct capybara) Mazama (brocket deer) and Tayassu (peccary), which could indicate a warmer, perhaps savanna-like climate.

References 

Prehistoric sloths
Prehistoric placental genera
Pleistocene xenarthrans
Holocene extinctions
Pleistocene mammals of South America
Lujanian
Pleistocene Venezuela
Fossils of Venezuela
Fossil taxa described in 2013